William Patrick Whalen (December 17, 1895 – January 28, 1961) was an American football center who played for four seasons for the Chicago Cardinals of the National Football League from 1920 to 1924.

References

1895 births
1961 deaths
American football centers
Chicago Cardinals players
Players of American football from Illinois
People from Champaign County, Illinois